is comedy-drama television series starring Hey! Say! JUMP's Ryosuke Yamada and Kyōka Suzuki, which aired on NTV from 21:00-21:54 on Saturday nights from January 14, 2012 to March 17, 2012. The screenplay was written by Shinji Nojima.

Synopsis
Having led a life of misfortune and having had no luck with men in her life, Umi Suzuki (Kyoka Suzuki) has one tremendous expectation for her son Daichi (Ryosuke Yamada): “It’s payback time and my son is going to make up for all of my past misery!” Umi has played the role of a good mother, but has secretly manipulated Daichi to become the “Perfect Son” who cares more about his mom than anyone else. Daichi, not knowing anything about her unspoken plan, has actually grown up to become a completely new type of “mama’s boy” who is so honest that he is not embarrassed to say out loud, “My mom is the most important person in the whole world.” Much to Umi’s delight, Daichi is accepted at a prestigious high school.

One day, Umi begins a new part-time job. However, when Daichi finds out that her new workplace is a high-school cafeteria full of villainous boys, he suddenly quits his elite high school and transfers to this notorious one in order to protect his mom, which leads to the collapse of Umi’s “perfect” scenario.

This intelligent, honest and sweet “perfect son” sometimes exceeds Umi’s expectations as he tries to please his mom too much.

Character Description

Daichi Suzuki 
The son of Umi Suzuki who has been raised to be the “Perfect Son”. He is good-looking, has excellent grades, and is pure and honest. Originally from the prestigious Meifu Private School, he moves to Sea King Public High School to look after his mother.
Umi Suzuki
The mother of Daichi Suzuki and works at Sea King Public High School. She has raised her son with the secret goal of having him buy her a house in the future.
Kengo Mifune
The leader of the Sea King Public High School students and has a potential to become a well-known boxer. He was abandoned by his mother during his childhood days thus depicting a rare attachment to Umi Suzuki.
Koji Kobayashi 
Heir of Marukoba Construction, he befriends Daichi Suzuki. He is a coward student and jealous of Daichi’s kind-hearted character.

Cast
Main Cast
Ryosuke Yamada as Daichi Suzuki
Kyōka Suzuki as Umi Suzuki
Taisuke Fujigaya as Kengo Mifune
Yuto Nakajima as Kouji Kobayashi

Extended cast
Anju Suzuki as Mitsuko Kobayashi
Ikki Sawamura as Minoru Kurahashi
Risa Sudo as Honda Kayoko
Masayo Umezawa as Nishida
Masako Miyaji as Ota
Rie Hagiwara as Yoshida
Ayaka Miyoshi as Sayaka Tanba

Sea King Public High School
Kouhei Takeda as Goro Uchiyama
Kendo Kobayashi as Toshio Kanbe (Homeroom/Physical Education Teacher)
Nobuaki Kaneko as Fuyuhiko Ikeda (Art teacher)
Tomohiro Waki as Iwao Tanba
Jingi Irie as Yuma Wanikawa
Tokio Emoto as Yoshikazu Habu
Daisuke Moromizato as Zoubayashi Tomoyuki
Jun Yoshinaga as Masako Hyouzuka

Guest
Kenji Anan as Masako's Father [Episode 5]
Nobuaki Kaneko as Yugo Suzuki [Episode 6-7] 
Kento Hayashi as Kinoo [Episode 6-7]
RED RICE as Junpei Handa [Episode 7]
Shunsuke Kazuma as Taka Tennouji [Episode 8]
Nobuaki Kaneko as Hiroyuki Shinoda [Episode 8-9]
Anna Ishibashi as Sora Shinoda [Episode 8-10]

Soundtrack

Theme song

The theme song of the drama was provided by Hey! Say! JUMP titled "SUPER DELICATE". The lyrics were written by Shinji Nojima, who also wrote the script for the drama.

Original soundtrack 
The drama's original soundtrack was released on February 22, 2012 the same day that "SUPER DELICATE" was released. Music was composed by Masaru Yokoyama.

Episodes

Production staff
Screenwriter: Shinji Nojima
Producers: Eriko Mikami, Yuta Fukui (福井雄太), Hiroshi Matsubara, Kuniko Yanai (柳内久仁子)
Directors: Noriyoshi Sakuma, Satoru Nakajima, Masahiro Mori
Music: Masaru Yokoyama (横山克)

References

External links
 Official Website

Japanese drama television series
Japanese comedy television series
Nippon TV dramas
2012 Japanese television series debuts
Television shows written by Shinji Nojima